Outworld was an American progressive metal band that was formed in 1997 by guitarist Rusty Cooley. Their name is allegedly taken from the fictional Outworld realm of the Mortal Kombat video games.

History
The original line-up of the band was keyboardist Bobby Williamson, guitarist Rusty Cooley, drummer Darren Davis and bassist Brent Marches. They set out to make instrumental music but soon after decided they wanted to also have vocals and added Kelly Sundown Carpenter.

They worked on two bonus tracks for Rusty Cooley's solo instrumental album (eventually released in 2003). Cooley departed Outworld in 2001 to pursue interests in Atlanta. However, in 2003 Cooley found himself back in both Houston and the band. Outworld signed a management deal with Danish-based Intromental in mid-2003. In 2004 Outworld added Shawn Kascak as bassist and Matt Smith as drummer, replacing Dubose and Davis. Kelly Sundown Carpenter decided to join Danish metal band Beyond Twilight in late 2004 but remained with Outworld until they added Carlos Zema as singer in fall 2006.

In December 2004, Outworld signed with Replica Records and recorded their first album, which was released November 13, 2006.

In August 2007, Outworld won the Famecast Fenom Contest in the Metal category, having been voted No. 1 in all six rounds of voting.

On March 12, 2008, The band announced founding member and keyboardist Bobby Williamson and vocalist Carlos Zema were leaving the band. They will be searching for a new singer as well as a second guitarist (instead of a keyboardist) for a heavier sound on the new record.

On March 24, 2009, Rusty Cooley announced that Outworld had disbanded, with members going on to other projects.

On March 26, 2013, the self-titled Outworld debut was re-issued in CD format via Rebel Tide Entertainment - this time including bonus track "Polar".

Musical style and influences
Outworld was ostensibly a progressive metal band, though they often blended many different styles. Their writing was influenced by bands such as Dream Theater, Iron Maiden, Pantera, and Symphony X, while their overall sound was influenced by the likes of Meshuggah and Nevermore.

Band line-up

Final line-up
 Rusty Cooley − Guitar (1997-2009)
 Shawn Kascak − Bass (2004-2009)
 Matt Smith − Drums (2006-2009)

Former members
 Bobby Williamson − Keyboard (1997–2008)
 Kelly Sundown Carpenter − Vocals (2000–2006)
 Carlos Zema − Vocals (2006–2008)
 Brent Marches − Bass (1997–2001)
 Shane Dubose − Bass (2003-2004)
 Darren Davis − Drums (1997–1999) (2003-2005)
 Danny Young − Drums (1999-2000)
 Jeff Huerta − Drums (2000-2001)
 Stephen Vance − Drums (2005)
 Mikey Lewis − Drums (2006)

Discography
 Demo (2004)
 Outworld (2006)
 Promo 2008 (2008)

References

External links
 Outworld official site
 Outworld page at Replica Records
 Official Outworld at MySpace

Musical groups from Houston
Heavy metal musical groups from Texas
Musical groups established in 1997
Musical groups disestablished in 2009
American progressive metal musical groups